The Old Town Sebastian Historic District, East is a U.S. historic district (designated as such on August 4, 2003) located in Sebastian, Florida. The district is bounded by Main and Washington Streets, Riverside Drive, and the FEC Railroad. It contains 13 historic buildings.

Gallery

References

External links

 Indian River County listings at National Register of Historic Places

National Register of Historic Places in Indian River County, Florida
Historic districts on the National Register of Historic Places in Florida
Geography of Indian River County, Florida